University High School (UHS) is an accelerated public high school located in Tucson, Arizona.  Originally known as Special Projects High School (SPHS), University High School is in the Tucson Unified School District (TUSD). The mission statement of UHS identifies it as "a special function high school which serves students who are academically focused and intellectually gifted and provides curriculum and social support not offered in the comprehensive high school."

Ranking and recognition
U.S. News & World Report has included UHS in their list of "America's Best High Schools" out of nearly 18,000 schools in the US:

In 2014, the Washington Post listed UHS at No. 28 in its review of "America's Most Challenging High Schools," which ranked the 1,900 highest-performing high schools nationally.

In 2013, the Daily Beast listed UHS at No. 19 in its annual list of the "Best 2,000 High Schools in the Nation.

In May 2006, Newsweek named UHS as one of "The Public Elites," schools that, "NEWSWEEK excluded...from the list of Best High Schools because so many of their students score well above average on the SAT and ACT."

In 2005 and 2016, it was honored as a Blue Ribbon school.

Notable alumni
Max Cannon, Creator of Red Meat comic strip
Gabby Giffords, U.S. Representative from Arizona's 8th district
Martha Crawford Heitzmann, vice president for research and development, Air Liquide, France
Kaiser Kuo, writer, musician, podcaster, and Director of International Communications at Baidu
Timothy Reckart, Academy Award nominated filmmaker
Zach Selwyn, actor, TV host, musician and writer Guinness World Records Gone Wild
Michael Thompson, Professional golfer
Jessica Grace Wing, composer and filmmaker
Deja Foxx, reproductive rights activist and political strategist.

References

External links
 UHS Website
 UHS Foundation and Alumni Association
 School Newspaper
 UHS Parents' Association

Public high schools in Arizona
Schools in Tucson, Arizona
Gifted education
1976 establishments in Arizona
Educational institutions established in 1976